The first communities of the Greeks in the Democratic Republic of the Congo were established prior to Belgian colonization. The Greek presence reached a peak in the 1950s when many Greeks fled Egypt following the revolution of 1952. The Greek communities organized their own schools and churches and Greeks were active in trade, fishing, transport, coffee growing and the music industry. Also, a small group of Greek Jews emigrated to the Congo in the early 20th Century.

History

Colonial Era

In the early to mid 20th century nearly all Congolese cities on the Belgian side had a Greek community and usually all hailing from a particular part of Greece as people would arrive, get settled in and send for their families. 
By the 1920s there were established Greek fishing and trading communities in the trading cities of Luapula and Katanga, where the Greeks plied the river trade of the Congo, ranging as far as Zambia where many settled. The traders and fishermen developed a good and likable reputation and cultivated good relations with their Congolese and Zambian colleagues as they were always ready to offer help or lend their equipment and traditional Greek skills in net and boat making. Later the Congolese Greeks played a significant role in launching the country's important music tradition by founding several recording companies like Olympia, Ngoma, Opika and others.

Post-independence
When the country declared its independence in 1960 there were violent clashes and uncertainty followed by three decades of totalitarian rule by Mobutu Sese Seko which led to the exodus of most Greek settlers and the decline of the Greek community. 

Around the year 2000 there were about 100 Greeks left in the capital Kinshasa and 200 in Lubumbashi. The holy temple of Saint George and the Club Hellenique are the focal points of the community. In 2006, 5,000 Greeks lived in the DR Congo.  Greek presence in modern Lubumbashi (former Elisabethville) has its roots in the 1920s. It is reported that in 1917, about 150 Greeks lived in the city the surrounding forests. More Greeks settled in the area during the periods 1936–39 and 1946–48. The Hellenic Community was established in 1923.The Hellenic Community of Lubumbashi appears very active. The schools of the Hellenic Community of Lubumbashi (SHCL) were founded in 1968 and operate since.

See also

Greek diaspora
Greeks in South Africa
Greeks in Zimbabwe

References

 
Greek diaspora in Africa
the Democratic Republic of the Congo
European diaspora in the Democratic Republic of the Congo